The Hotel 24 South is a historic hotel in Staunton, Virginia, opened in 1924.

History
The hotel was built in 1924 as the Stonewall Jackson Hotel. Designed by H.L. Stevens, it is considered an excellent example of the architect's work in the Colonial Revival style. A working 1924 Wurlitzer organ, believed to be the only one of its kind, is located in the mezzanine the hotel.  The organ has been precisely restored to it original condition and tone. The hotel's famous neon sign was erected about 1950, and was known for many years as "a major downtown landmark". 

The hotel completed a major restoration in 2005, at a cost of $19.3 million, and a further renovation in 2017 that cost $2 million. It was valued at $6 million in 2020.

After public protests in June 2020, the owners of the hotel, Staunton Hotel, LLC, announced its name, in honor of Confederate general Stonewall Jackson, would be changed. In July 2020, the lettering with the hotel's name was removed from the facade. In August 2020, after further protests, the enormous neon sign was removed from the roof, and on September 1, 2020, the hotel was officially renamed Hotel 24 South, for the hotel's address of 24 South Market Street and its grand opening year of 1924.

The hotel is operated by Crestline Hotels & Resorts and is a member of the National Trust for Historic Preservation Historic Hotels of America.

See also
 List of Historic Hotels of America

References

External links 
 Hotel 24 South - official website
 Valley of the Shadow
 Crestline Hotels and Resorts

Hotels in Virginia
Buildings and structures in Staunton, Virginia
Hotels established in 1924
Hotel buildings completed in 1924
Public venues with a theatre organ
Historic Hotels of America